7,12-Dimethylbenz[a]anthracene (DMBA) is an immunosuppressor and a powerful organ-specific laboratory carcinogen. DMBA is widely used in many research laboratories studying cancer. DMBA serves as a tumor initiator. Tumor promotion can be induced with treatments of 12-O-tetradecanoylphorbol-13-acetate (TPA) in some models of two-stage carcinogenesis. This allows for a greatly accelerated rate of tumor growth, making many cancer studies possible.

References

Polycyclic aromatic hydrocarbons
Carcinogens
Anthracenes
Immunosuppressants